Salish Kootenai College (SKC) is a private tribal land-grant community college in Pablo, Montana.  It serves the Bitterroot Salish, Kootenai, and Pend d'Oreilles tribes. SKC's main campus is on the Flathead Reservation. There are three satellite locations in eastern Washington state, in Colville, Spokane, and Wellpinit. Approximately 1,207 students attend SKC. Although enrollment is not limited to Native American students, SKC's primary function is to serve the needs of Native American people.

History
Prior to 1978, SKC was a branch campus of Flathead Valley Community College (FVCC). SKC is a tribal college, chartered in 1977 under the sovereign governmental authority of the Confederated Salish and Kootenai Tribes. In 1981, the college formally disassociated from FVCC and became completely self-governing. The college was designated a land-grant college in 1994 alongside 31 other tribal colleges.

In 2015, a satellite designed by SKC students and faculty was successfully deployed into low earth orbit under NASA's CubeSat Launch Initiative, making it the first operational CubeSat designed by a tribal college. BisonSat's primary mission objective is to transmit image data of earth with a targeted ground sample distance of 100 meters.

Some former employees sued the college in 2017 under the Federal False Claims Act, saying that the administration had falsified student records in order to continue receiving public grant funding from the United States Department of Human Services and the United States Department of Indian Health Services. This suit was dismissed with prejudice in May 2018 by United States District Court, D. Montana, Missoula Division in a determination that the lawsuit violated tribal sovereignty of the Confederation Salish and Kootenai Tribes.

Academics
SKC offers 17 bachelor's degree programs, 24 associate degree programs, and 6 certificate programs.  Although most of the degree programs are career-oriented, students can elect to take courses of study in fields such as the liberal arts and Native American Studies.

Partnerships

SKC is a member of the American Indian Higher Education Consortium, a community of tribally and federally chartered institutions working to strengthen tribal nations and make a lasting difference in the lives of American Indians and Alaska Natives. SKC was created to serve the needs of American Indians for higher education. SKC generally serves geographically isolated populations that have no other means to gain higher education beyond the high school level.

Athletics
The sports teams are nicknamed the "Bison" and "Lady Bison". Although they are not within any athletic association. SKCs men's basketball program has won 3 consecutive American Indian Higher Education Consortium Basketball Championships (05, 06, 07) and the women have won 2 (03, 07). The Bison, and Lady Bison also are the current AIHEC champions, both winning the 2014 tournament.

Scholarships
Scholarships available through the American Indian College Fund (AICF)

See also 
Confederated Salish and Kootenai Tribes of the Flathead Nation
American Indian College Fund (AICF)

References

External links
Official website

1981 establishments in Montana
Educational institutions established in 1981
Tribal Colleges in Montana
Education in Lake County, Montana
American Indian Higher Education Consortium
Universities and colleges accredited by the Northwest Commission on Colleges and Universities
Ktunaxa